Group B of the 2013 Fed Cup Asia/Oceania Zone Group I was one of four pools in the Asia/Oceania zone of the 2013 Fed Cup. Three teams competed in a round robin competition, with the top team and the bottom team proceeding to their respective sections of the play-offs: the top team played for advancement to the World Group II Play-offs, while the bottom team faced potential relegation to Group II.

Standings

Round robin

China vs. South Korea

Chinese Taipei vs. Uzbekistan

China vs. Uzbekistan

Chinese Taipei vs. South Korea

China vs. Chinese Taipei

Uzbekistan vs. South Korea

References

External links
 Fed Cup website

2013 Fed Cup Asia/Oceania Zone